Francis Stuart (1902–2000) was an Irish writer.

Francis Stuart may also refer to:
Francis Hamilton Stuart, Australian diplomat (1912–2007)
Francis Stuart, 7th Earl of Moray ( bef. 1683–1739)
Francis Stuart, 9th Earl of Moray (1737–1810), Earl of Moray
Francis Stuart, 10th Earl of Moray (1771–1848)
Francis Stuart, 11th Earl of Moray (1795–1859), Earl of Moray
Francis Godolphin Osbourne Stuart (c.1843–1923), Scottish photographer
Frank Stuart (born Francis Stuart) (1844–1910), Australian politician
Francis Stuart (sailor) (1589–1635), Scottish sailor

See also

Francis Stewart (disambiguation)